Maria Aparecida Barbosa de Souza (born 5 September 1971) is a Brazilian athlete. She competed in the women's triple jump at the 1996 Summer Olympics.

References

1971 births
Living people
Athletes (track and field) at the 1996 Summer Olympics
Brazilian female triple jumpers
Olympic athletes of Brazil
Place of birth missing (living people)